Dalcombank was one of the largest banks in the Russian Far East. Its headquarters are located on Lenin Square in Khabarovsk. It was merged with MTS Bank in 2012.

History
On April 25, 1989 bank charter was registered by Central bank board under number 84. Back then Dalcombank was the first commercial bank in the Russian Far East.

Dalcombank shareholders were:
 Machine manufacturing plant
 Ordjonikidze oil processing company
 Khabarovsk region cash collection company
 “Dalenergomash” plant
 Savings Bank of USSR, Khabarovsk region
 “Promzoloto” company
 “Dallesprom” company

From 1994 till 2004 Dalcombank was authorized dealer of Khabarovsk Territory Administration at budget execution.

1997 – Dalcombank was joined with another regional bank named HAKObank

Since 2006 Dalcombank has been serving the subventions, which were apportioned to young families for gaining habitation within the limits of subprogramme “Providing young families with habitation” of federal purpose program “Habitation”.

In 2008 within the limits of realization of program in state supporting of debtors fell within complicated living situation OJSC Dalcombank became an official agent of OJSC “Mortgage Credits Restructuring Agency” in the Far Eastern Federal District

Owners and supervision
OJSC Dalcombank along with the Joint Stock Commercial Bank “Moscow Bank for Reconstruction and Development” (MBRD) and East-West United Bank (EWUB) is included in bank group of JSFC Sistema. In August 2007 corporation purchased 20% of OJSC Dalcombank shares. In October 2007 it increased its ownership to 48,16% and in January 2008 to 98,65% as a result of public offer to Dalcombank shareholders. On August 14, 2008 JSFC Sistema increased in the Joint Stock Company “Dalcombank” from 98,65% to 100% of the company’s share capital.

From the moment of establishing up to the present days, Anrey Shlyakhovoi was the President and Board of directors Chairman.

Business foundations
On June 1, 2009 branch network included 80 outlets in 8 regions of Russian Federation: Amurskiy, Irkutsk, Jewish Autonomous, Primorskiy, Khabarovsk regions, Sakha republic and 34 other towns and settlements.

Developing Bank’s infrastructure was pointed by RBC-rating (Dalcombank entered Top-100 of largest Russian banks with most developed branch network in 2008 at 51st place).

Dalcombank has been participant and leader of cashless transactions of national payment system “Golden Crown” (from 1998) and participant of international payment systems Visa and MasterCard.

Bank is repeated laureate of “Banking” magazine’s prize in nomination “Best Regional Bank”, owner of Long-term issuer default (IDR) at “B+”, Short-term IDR “B”, Individual “E”, Support “4”, National Long-term “A- (A minus)(rus)” (of Fitch Ratings), and “B++” “Acceptable level of solvency with positive prospects” (of rating agency “Expert RA”).

Financial activities
Financial activities on January 1, 2010 are:

 Balance is 31.6 billion RUB
 Equity capital is 2.1 billion RUB
 Credit portfolio is 14.2 billion RUB, including 6.7 billion RUB of consumer credit portfolio.
 Debt assets are 17.2 billion RUB 12.7 of which are individual’s means.
 Balance profit is 116.9 billion RUB

Dalcombank took 55th place by the volume of the deposits to individuals in the list of largest Russian banks according to the center of the economic analysis “Interfax”. RBC-rating included Dalcombank on 99th position in TOP-500 among most profitable banks in “Most profitable and efficient banks of Russia of 2008” rating.

References

External links

 Official web-site of Dalcombank (in English)
 Official web-site of Dalcombank (in Russian)

Defunct banks of Russia
Companies based in Khabarovsk Krai